Treasure Coast High School, abbreviated TCHS, is a high school located in Port St. Lucie, Florida. The school's name is taken from the Treasure Coast, the name of the region where the school is located, due to the presence of shipwrecks off its coast.

Campus 

Treasure Coast High School is made up of four buildings and a central courtyard. The campus is designed to be very open and large to accommodate its students. The campus has trees and other plants. Three of the four buildings are two-story. The only building that does not have a second story is building three, which contains the auditorium, gymnasium, and several elective classes.

The school was designed so it would be possible to get to any class, from anywhere on campus, within five minutes.

Academics 

Treasure Coast High School offers many classes, separated into Small Learning Communities, which are also known as academies. The SLCs are a part of a Global Community which includes the 9th Grade S.T.A.R.S. (Students Transitioning & Aspiring to Reach Success) academy, the 10th Grade Explorer Academy, and the various career academies.

Below is a list of the Career Academies, as well as classes that may be taken at the school:

Academies 

A.I.C.E Program, sponsored by the University of Cambridge
AS and A-Level English Literature
AS and A-Level Global Perspectives
AS and A-Level Mathematics
AS and A-Level Psychology
AS and A-Level United States History
AS-Level Art & Design
AS-Level Biology
AS-Level Chemistry
AS-Level Economics
AS-Level English Language
AS-Level Environmental Management
AS-Level European History
AS-Level French Language
AS-Level General Paper
AS-Level Graphic Design
AS-Level Marine Science
AS-Level Media Studies
AS-Level Music
AS-Level Physical Education
AS-Level Sociology
AS-Level Spanish Language
AS-Level Spanish Literature
AS-Level Thinking Skills

Public Service and Safety
Health Science & Allied Health Assisting
First Responder
Nursing Assistant

Criminal Justice

US Air Force JROTC
Aerospace Science
Leadership Education

Teacher Assisting

Visionary House
Creative Photography
Digital Photography
Drawing
Entertainment Marketing
Graphic Design
International Business
New Media Technology

Culinary Arts

Innovation House
Biotechnology
Pre-Engineering & Manufacturing

The School's Yearbook is called "The Odyssey", named after the epic by Homer.

Athletics
Fall Sports
Football
Bowling
Cross Country
Golf
Swimming
Volleyball
Cheerleading

Winter Sports
Basketball
Wrestling
Girls' Weightlifting
Soccer

Spring Sports
Baseball
Softball
Track (including UNIFY)
Tennis
Flag football

Cheerleading
Fall-season football cheerleading
Winter-season basketball cheerleading

Technology
Each classroom is equipped with a teacher laptop, data projectors, document camera and an audio enhancement microphone system. Each "quad", named after how the central lobby and classrooms are shaped, is provided with a wireless mobile laptop unit for instant access to online resources.

The school also has a manufacturing lab, complete with machinery, to accommodate pre-engineering students, as well as a large kitchen to accommodate culinary arts students. The school also has many computer labs scattered throughout the campus, a complete and working security system, Wi-Fi Connectivity, and a Cell Phone monitoring device.

Performing Arts 
The performing arts department at Treasure Coast High School is made up of the band, dance, drama programs.

Recognitions

In the 2008–2009 school year, the Florida Department of Education rated Treasure Coast High School a "C" school, for the second year in a row.

In the 2009–2010 school year, the Florida Department of Education rated Treasure Coast High School a "B" school. It is the first true public high school in the St. Lucie County School District to be rated "B" with the exception of Lincoln Park Academy, a magnet school.

TCHS received a B grade for the 2016–17 school year, thus making it eight consecutive years as a B school.

References 

High schools in St. Lucie County, Florida
Port St. Lucie, Florida
Public high schools in Florida
2006 establishments in Florida
Educational institutions established in 2006